Meri Pyaari Bindu is a 2017 Indian Hindi-language romantic drama film, written by Suprotim Sengupta and directed by Akshay Roy. It features Parineeti Chopra and Ayushmann Khurrana in the lead roles.

The principal photography of the film began in Kolkata in May 2016 and was wrapped in October 2016. The film was released on 12 May 2017.

Plot
Abhimanyu 'Abhi' Roy, a well known writer, has hit the roadblock and unable to write a novel. The manager forces him to write novel quickly. Thus he takes a break and moves to his house in Kolkata, along with his wish to attend a birthday party there.

Abhi flashes back to his childhood days, when Bindu Shankaranarayan, a young girl aspiring to become a singer, shifts to his locality and becomes his neighbour. The two quickly bond over and become best friends. Abhi falls in love with Bindu much to his mother's dismay. However, he never conveys his real feelings to Bindu and is happy being just friends with her. 

One day, Bindu's mother dies in an accident. Heartbroken, Bindu blames her father as he was driving the car while drunk. Her growing resentment towards her father forces her to leave college and go to Melbourne. Meanwhile, Abhi graduates from his college and goes to Bangalore to study Master of Business Administration. Both of them remain in touch through letters and postcards where she tells him that she got engaged (which she breaks off later.) The communication between them stops. 

After a few years, Abhi goes to Goa, where he meets Bindu. Bindu tells him that she is engaged for the third time (she was also engaged in between which she also breaks off) and this time she really likes the guy. Abhi is heartbroken and returns to Mumbai where he works in a bank but stays in touch with Bindu. 

One day, Bindu calls him to a restaurant and tells him that she did not marry that man as he fled. Abhi tries to reconcile their friendship and goes out of his way to tend to Bindu's needs. His girlfriend leaves him as he is always busy with Bindu. She starts working as a dubbing artist and they spend more time together and later fall in love with each other. Bindu's dream comes true as she gets a chance to become a singer but her album is not received well upon its release. Bindu is devastated and their relationship is strained because of her failure. Abhi proposes to her for marriage, but Bindu refuses saying she isn't happy and wants to find herself. Bindu leaves for Bangalore. She repeatedly apologise to Abhi and writes emails to him but he never replies.

2 years, Abhi becomes a writer who writes erotic horror novels, as his first novel becomes a hit. On the day his first novel gets published, he receives a call from Bindu, saying that she is getting married to someone. Hurt, Abhi admits he is happy for her, wishing her congrats. 

As viewers return to the present, it is raining in Kolkata, so Abhi takes shelter in a place where the two friends would spend time with each other. Surprisingly, he meets a young girl, who is revealed to be Bindu's daughter. Bindu is now married to a Mr. Nair. Abhi shows her the manuscript of their love story which has a happy ending to it and gives it to her and says that he doesn't want anybody else to read the manuscript, as it just belongs to two of them. 

The film ends as Abhi and Bindu dance together at the birthday party and Abhi saying that today Bindu may be someone's mother, daughter-in-law or wife but for him she will always remain the same dear Bindu he met in his childhood.

Cast
Parineeti Chopra as Bindu Shankarnarayanan
Ayushmann Khurrana as Abhimanyu "Abhi" Roy a.k.a. Bubla
Rajatava Dutta as Bubla's father
Aparajita Adhya as Bubla's mother
Prakash Belawadi as Bindu's father
June Malia as Bindu's mother
Kharaj Mukherjee as over-excited relative
 Biswajit Chakraborty as a neighbor
 Kamalika Banerjee as Boobi Mashi
Abish Mathew as Bubla's friend in Mumbai
 Lama Halder as shopkeeper
 Prabal Punjabi
 Amrita Bagchi as Abhimanyu's girlfriend
 Nishant Dahiya
 Priya Mondal

Box office

Soundtrack

The film soundtrack of Meri Pyaari Bindu is composed by Sachin–Jigar with lyrics by Kausar Munir and Priya Saraiya. The songs in the film has been sung by Arijit Singh, Ayushmann Khurrana, Sonu Nigam, Parineeti Chopra, Clinton Cerejo, Dominique Cerejo, Monali Thakur, Nakash Aziz, Sanah Moidutty, Jigar Saraiya and Jonita Gandhi. Chopra recorded her first song "Maana Ke Hum Yaar Nahin" for the film. The full soundtrack, which consists of a total of 7 songs was released on 20 April 2017.

Reception
On review aggregator website Rotten Tomatoes, the film holds an approval rating of 44% based on 9 reviews, and an average rating of 5.38/10.

Accolades

References

External links

2017 films
2010s Hindi-language films
2017 romantic comedy-drama films
Films shot in Kolkata
Indian romantic comedy-drama films